August Walle-Hansen (16 January 1877 – 1964) was a Norwegian businessperson.

After middle school and commerce school, he was hired in the family company Brødrene Hansen in 1893. He was a son of Jørgen Hansen, who had founded the company together with two brothers in 1864. August's brother Thomas Walle-Hansen was also hired.

He was a board member of Forsikringsselskapet Viking and supervisory council member of Den norske Creditbank, Grand Hotel and Norsk Hotelcompagnie. He was a member of the gentlemen's skiing club SK Fram from 1891, and received honorary membership in 1964. He died later the same year.

References

1877 births
1964 deaths
Businesspeople from Oslo
SK Fram members